Frederick Eden (26 June 1829 – 5 December 1916) was an English first-class cricketer and barrister.

The son of Arthur Eden, he was born in June 1829 at Wimbledon. He was educated at Eton College, before going up to Merton College, Oxford. While studying at Oxford, he made a single appearance in first-class cricket for Oxford University against the Marylebone Cricket Club at Lord's in 1850. Batting twice in the match, he opened the batting alongside his cousin Frederick Morton Eden, scoring 18 runs in the Oxford first-innings before being dismissed by Jemmy Dean, while in their second-innings he as dismissed for a single run by the same bowler. A student of Lincoln's Inn, he was called to the bar in April 1864. Eden died at Venice in December 1916.

References

External links

1829 births
1916 deaths
People from Wimbledon, London
People educated at Eton College
Alumni of Merton College, Oxford
English cricketers
Oxford University cricketers
Members of Lincoln's Inn
English cricketers of 1826 to 1863
English barristers